Wang Jianan (born 20 January 1983) is a Chinese-born Congolese table tennis player. At the 2016 Summer Olympics he competed in the Men's singles.

References

External links

1983 births
Living people
Table tennis players from Baoding
Chinese emigrants to the Republic of the Congo
Sportspeople of Chinese descent
Naturalised table tennis players
Naturalized citizens of Republic of the Congo
Chinese male table tennis players
Republic of the Congo table tennis players
Sportspeople from Brazzaville
Olympic table tennis players of the Republic of Congo
Table tennis players at the 2016 Summer Olympics
African Games gold medalists for the Republic of the Congo
African Games medalists in table tennis
African Games bronze medalists for the Republic of the Congo
Competitors at the 2015 African Games